The American Association of Immunologists (AAI) is an international scientific society dedicated to furthering the study of immunology. AAI provides its members with a variety of platforms in which to exchange ideas and present the latest immunological research, including the AAI annual meeting and The Journal of Immunology. In 2017, AAI launched an open-access journal, ImmunoHorizons. AAI is a founding member society of the Federation of American Societies for Experimental Biology (FASEB).

Mission 
The American Association of Immunologists is an association of professionally trained scientists from all over the world dedicated to advancing the knowledge of immunology and its related disciplines, fostering the interchange of ideas and information among investigators, and addressing the potential integration of immunologic principles into clinical practice. AAI serves its members by providing a center for the dissemination of information relevant to the field and its practices, such as educational and professional opportunities, scientific meetings, membership-derived issues and opinions, and important social and political issues.

History 
The AAI was founded on June 19, 1913, in Minneapolis, Minnesota, by a group of physicians who were attending the annual meeting of the American Medical Association. The original 41 members of the society were all disciples of Almroth Wright, the founder and director of the Inoculation Department at St. Mary's Hospital in London.  The first AAI annual meeting was held in Atlantic City, New Jersey, on June 22, 1914.

Governance 
AAI is led by a council of eight scientists who are elected by voting members of AAI. The council includes four officers—president, vice-president, secretary-treasurer, and past president—as well as four additional councilors.

Loretta Doan became chief executive officer of AAI in January 2023. She had previously been chief science officer at the American Association for Clinical Chemistry. In that role, she was most notable for her work on COVID-19 and for advancing diversity and inclusion. Before her tenure at AACC, Doan was director of science policy at the Endocrine Society.

Publications 
AAI is the publisher of The Journal of Immunology and ImmunoHorizons. The association also publishes the bimonthly "AAI Newsletter", which informs members of developments in public policy, achievement of AAI members, meeting announcements, and other association news.

Membership 
AAI has 7,700 members in 68 countries. Its membership includes principal investigators, postdoctoral fellows, graduate students, administrators, and other professionals dedicated to furthering the study of immunology.

Nobel laureates 
Since 1919, 27 AAI members have been awarded the Nobel Prize. All laureates received the Nobel Prize in physiology or medicine, except where indicated.

Lifetime Achievement Award recipients

Past presidents

References 

Immunology organizations
Immunology lists
 
Lists of American people by occupation